Charles Leroux Monument (also in ) is a sculpture in Maarjamäe, Tallinn, Estonia.

The sculpture was made by Mati Karmin. The sculpture was opened in 1989.

References

Monuments and memorials in Estonia
Tallinn